Alice Recoque (born Arnaud; 29 August 1929 – 28 January 2021) was a French computer scientist, computer engineer and computer architecture specialist. She worked on the designs of mini-computers  in the 1970s and led research focused on artificial intelligence.

Early life 
Alice Arnaud was born on 29 August 1929 in Cherchell, Algeria. She finished École supérieure de physique et de chimie industrielles in 1954 with a title of graduate engineer.

Career 

She started working at Société d'électronique et d'automatisme (SAE) in 1954. At SAE she worked on core memories of CAB1101. In 1956 Alice Recoque and Françoise Becquet started designing the mini-computer CAB500 - the first conversational desktop computer, under the direction of André Richard and François-Henri Raymond. The computer was released in 1960. The CAB500 was a French low cost mini-computer, the purpose of which was to do complex, scientific calculations. She also worked on the CINA industrial computer and co-directed the CAB 1500 project, related to the Algol language machines.

After the merger of SAE and CAE, the Compagnie internationale pour l'informatique (CII) was born in 1966. She continued her work at CII when she worked on designing Mitra computers. The first design, Mitra 15, launched in 1972. Both the Mitra 15 and CAB500 were commercial successes in France.She only stayed there for a few months, because some features of the project, interesting in itself, were unsuited to the needs of the CII. Moreover, the needs of the latter in the field of small computers are becoming clearer and Alice Recoque is asked to make them concrete by developing a project. The target market is that of industrial and scientific applications, aimed at completing the range of IRIS mainframe computers, which is very much oriented towards management applications.

In 1978, she took part in the meeting that founded the National Commission for Data Processing and Liberties. She expressed her concerns and the need to set up a safeguard against "the increased surveillance power of companies and States".

She led the Bull Group at CII. In 1985 the Bull Group focused on the research on highly parallel machines and artificial intelligence. This project, code-named Q0, is adopted by the company's management and will give birth to the Mitra range. Alice Recoque is appointed head of research and development for the CII's "Small Computers and Associated Systems" division and leads the Mitra 15 project through to its industrialisation. During that period she helped develop the language KOOL (knowledge representation object-oriented language) with its implementation in LISP.

Following the absorption of CII by Honeywell-Bull, Alice Recoque, who conducts research on massively parallel architectures, particularly on multi-microprocessors, becomes responsible for relations with research and higher education. In this capacity, in addition to the functional aspects of these relations, she participates in juries or thesis management. In 1982, she was appointed a member of the IT commission of the National Scientific Research Committee, which defines CNRS policy in this sector. She was chosen to write the chapter on computer architecture in the reference publication Techniques de l'ingénieur.

In January 1985, the Bull Group appointed her director of the "Artificial Intelligence" mission. She extended the concept, hitherto confined to aspects of computer programming, to all methods and techniques aimed at studying human behaviour in order to understand and reproduce it. During this mission, carried out in close collaboration with public research bodies such as the French National Institute for Research in Computer Science and Control (Inria), Alice Recoque, leading the strategy that mobilised more than 200 people, defined the range of products to be developed by Bull in order to propose a coherent offer in the field of artificial intelligence. These include the development of a grammar in Prolog II intended to understand writings formulated in natural language (in French), the design of the Knowledge representation Object-Oriented Language (KOOL), developed in Lisp for Bull SPS-7 machines (derived from the CNET's SM-90) and intended for the representation of knowledge, and various expert systems.

In 1989, Alice Recoque was appointed associate member of the Conseil Général des Ponts et Chaussées. In 1993 this appointment was renewed for three years.

She was a speaker at The European Association for microprocessing and microprogramming in August 1975.

Alice Recoque created and taught computer structure at ISEP for many years. She also taught computer science in other schools such as the Ecole Centrale de Paris, Supélec and the Institut Catholique de Paris.

The Mitra range of computers 
The goal of the Mitra project was to compete with the new minis, such as Digital Equipment Corporation's PDP-11 and Data General Nova.

This range included several models, first the Mitra 15 (Mitra 15-20 and Mitra 15–30) released in 1972; then the Mitra 125, designed by a new team in 1975, with extended addressing capabilities, and finally the Mitra 225. In total, nearly 8,000 Mitra 15s were sold, some of which were still in use at the end of the 1990s.

Appreciated for its performance, robustness and reliability, the Mitra 15 has been designed from the outset to be adaptable to a wide range of applications, thanks to an innovative firmware system. Aimed at industrial process control or scientific computing, it was quickly adapted to data transmission, whether in proprietary CII and Unidata systems or as a node in the CYCLADES Network and in secondary education (the so-called "58 high schools" experiment).

In France, the telecommunications administration has made extensive use of the Mitra family of computers: the Mitra 15 equipped the E10N4 pre-series telephone switches between 1972 and 1976, then the Mitra 125 equipped the E10N3 telephone switches from 1976 and finally the Mitra 225 equipped the E10N1 telephone switches from 1981 until the replacement in 1996 of the said computers, the last examples of which ceased to be manufactured in 1993.

Achievements 
In 1979 she received the Ordre national du Mérite - Au grade de Chevalier.

In 1985 she was promoted for the Officier de l'ordre national du Mérite.

In 2016 she became an honor member of Société informatique de France.

Controversy 
According to Pierre-Eric Mounier-Kuhn, a computer historian, the work of Alice Recoque has been slow to be recognised because little is said about engineers in France and because she is a woman, which would also explain the battle that had to be fought "to prevent Wikipedia from deleting the notice on Alice Recoque".

References 

1929 births
2021 deaths
Pieds-Noirs
French women computer scientists
French computer scientists
People from Cherchell
Computer engineers
Women engineers
Women computer scientists